Srednja škola Petrinja is a public high school in the town of Petrinja, in Sisak-Moslavina County, Croatia.

The Neo-Renaissance school building, built in 1871, was severely damaged in the 2020 Petrinja earthquake.

References

External links
Srednja škola Petrinja website

Schools in Croatia
Educational institutions established in 1860
Sisak-Moslavina County
1860 establishments in the Austrian Empire